Home Improvement received numerous awards and nominations in its 8-season run.  Notable awards and nominations include:

ASCAP Award
1992
WON - Top TV Series - (Dan Foliart)
1993
WON - Top TV Series - (Dan Foliart) 
1994
WON - Top TV Series - (Dan Foliart) 
1995
WON - Top TV Series - (Dan Foliart) 
1996
WON - Top TV Series - (Dan Foliart) 
1997
WON - Top TV Series - (Dan Foliart)
1998
WON - Top TV Series - (Dan Foliart) 
2000
WON - Top TV Series - (Dan Foliart)

Casting Society of America
1992
Nominated - Best Casting for TV, "Pilot" - (Deborah Barylski)

Golden Globe Awards
1993
Nominated - Best Performance by an Actor in a Television Series - Musical or Comedy (Tim Allen)
1994
Nominated - Best Television Series - Musical or Comedy
Nominated - Best Performance by an Actress in a Television Series - Musical or Comedy (Patricia Richardson)
Nominated - Best Performance by an Actor in a Television Series - Musical or Comedy (Tim Allen)
1995
Nominated - Best Television Series - Musical or Comedy
Nominated - Best Performance by an Actress in a Television Series - Musical or Comedy (Patricia Richardson)
WON - Best Performance by an Actor in a Television Series - Musical or Comedy (Tim Allen)
1996
Nominated - Best Performance by an Actor in a Television Series - Musical or Comedy (Tim Allen)
1997
Nominated - Best Performance by an Actor in a Television Series - Musical or Comedy (Tim Allen)

Humanitas Prize
1996
Nominated - 30 Minute Category (Elliot Shoenman and Marley Sims)
For the episode "The Longest Day".

Nickelodeon Kids' Choice Awards
1994
WON - Favorite Television Actor (Tim Allen)
WON - Favorite Television Show
1995
WON - Favorite Television Actor (Tim Allen)
WON - Favorite Television Show
1996
WON - Favorite Television Actor (Tim Allen)
WON - Favorite Television Show
1997
WON - Favorite Television Actor (Tim Allen)
WON - Favorite Television Show
Nominated - Favorite Television Actor (Jonathan Taylor Thomas)
1998
WON - Favorite Television Actor (Jonathan Taylor Thomas)
Nominated - Favorite Television Actor (Tim Allen)
Nominated - Favorite Television Show
1999
Nominated - Favorite Television Actor (Tim Allen)
Nominated - Favorite Television Actor (Jonathan Taylor Thomas)

People's Choice Awards
1992
WON - Favorite New TV Comedy Series
WON - Favorite Male Performer in a New TV Series (Tim Allen)
1993
WON - Favorite TV Comedy Series
WON - Favorite Male TV Performer (Tim Allen)
1994
WON - Favorite TV Comedy Series
WON - Favorite Male TV Performer (Tim Allen)
1995
WON - Favorite TV Comedy Series
WON - Favorite Male TV Performer (Tim Allen)
1996
WON - Favorite Male TV Performer (Tim Allen)
1997
WON - Favorite Male Television Performer (Tim Allen)
1998
WON - Favorite Male Television Performer (Tim Allen)
1999
WON - Favorite Male Television Performer (Tim Allen)

Primetime Emmy Awards
1993
Nominated - Outstanding Comedy Series
Nominated - Outstanding Lead Actor in a Comedy Series (Tim Allen)
1994
Nominated - Outstanding Comedy Series
Nominated - Outstanding Lead Actress in a Comedy Series (Patricia Richardson)
1996
Nominated - Outstanding Lead Actress in a Comedy Series (Patricia Richardson)
1997
Nominated - Outstanding Lead Actress in a Comedy Series (Patricia Richardson)
1998
Nominated - Outstanding Lead Actress in a Comedy Series (Patricia Richardson)

TV Guide Awards
1999
WON - Favorite Actor in a Comedy (Tim Allen)

TV Land Awards
2009
WON - Fan Favorite Award (Tim Allen, Patricia Richardson, Zachary Ty Bryan, Jonathan Taylor Thomas, Taran Noah Smith, Richard Karn, Debbie Dunning, Earl Hindman, and the rest of the cast of Home Improvement.)

YoungStar Awards
1997
Nominated - Best Performance by a Young Actor in a Comedy TV Series (Jonathan Taylor Thomas)
1998
Nominated - Best Performance by a Young Actor in a Comedy TV Series (Jonathan Taylor Thomas)
1999
WON - Best Performance by a Young Actor in a Comedy TV Series (Zachery Ty Bryan)

References

External links
Awards for Home Improvement at IMDb

Lists of awards by television series
Awards